Răscăeți is a commune in Dâmbovița County, Muntenia, Romania. It is composed of two villages, Răscăeți and Vultureanca.

References

Communes in Dâmbovița County
Localities in Muntenia